The 2022 Los Angeles FC season was the club's fifth season in Major League Soccer, the top tier of the American soccer pyramid. LAFC played its home matches at the Banc of California Stadium in the Exposition Park neighborhood of Los Angeles, California. Steve Cherundolo is the club's second head coach, joining on January 3, 2022.

The club won their second Supporters' Shield and first MLS Cup title, hosting the final at Banc of California Stadium on November 5, 2022.

Squad

First-team roster

Coaching staff

Transfers

Transfers in

Transfers out

Draft picks
Los Angeles FC did not participate in the 2022 MLS Superdraft as the club traded their draft picks in exchange for new players and General Allocation Money.

Competitions

Preseason

Coachella Valley Invitational

MLS

Standings

Western Conference

Overall

Results by round

Matches

All matches are in Pacific time

MLS Cup Playoffs

MLS Cup

U.S. Open Cup

Los Angeles FC will enter the Open Cup in the Third Round.

Leagues Cup

Statistics

References

Los Angeles FC
Los Angeles FC
Los Angeles FC
Los Angeles FC
Los Angeles FC seasons
MLS Cup champion seasons